Jeffrey Dustin Frye (born August 31, 1966) is an American former professional baseball second baseman. Currently, he is a baseball player agent.

Born in Oakland, California, he graduated from high school in Panama, Oklahoma, and played college baseball at Southeastern Oklahoma State University.

Career
Frye was drafted by the Texas Rangers in the 30th round of the 1988 amateur draft and made his big league debut with them on July 9, 1992, at Arlington Stadium during a 14–4 Rangers victory over the Cleveland Indians. Frye went 2-for-3, including a triple, walk, RBI and three runs, as the starting second baseman and leadoff hitter. His first career home run came on July 24, 1992, off Baltimore Orioles pitcher Arthur Rhodes at Oriole Park at Camden Yards. He missed the 1993 season due to injury.

In 1996, after hitting just .238 in 49 games with the Rangers' American Association affiliate Oklahoma City 89ers, Frye was released. That same day, June 5, he was signed as a free agent with the Boston Red Sox. He had a career year in 1997 when he hit .310 with 6 home runs in 127 games. He missed the entire 1998 season due to an injured left knee but returned for the 1999 season, playing in 47 games.

Frye became a bench player when the Red Sox signed second baseman José Offerman prior to the 1999 season and, on July 27, 2000, was traded to the Colorado Rockies with Brian Rose and John Wasdin in exchange for Rolando Arrojo, Rick Croushore and Mike Lansing.

On December 11, 2000, he signed as a free agent with the Toronto Blue Jays. On August 3, 2001 at a game in the SkyDome, aphids were in the ballpark causing him to wear a mask on his face for the whole game.

He made history on August 17, 2001, when he became the second Blue Jay in history to hit for the cycle. The first Blue Jays player to hit for the cycle was Kelly Gruber, who happened to be in attendance that day.

Frye's final big league appearance came on September 20, 2001, as he pinch-hit for catcher Darrin Fletcher in the 8th inning of a 12–6 loss to the Orioles. Frye flew out to left field and remained in the game at second base, replacing Homer Bush defensively.

Frye began working as an agent after retiring. He has represented players including Darren Oliver and Ian Kinsler.

See also
 List of Major League Baseball players to hit for the cycle

References

External links

Venezuelan Professional Baseball League statistics

1966 births
Living people
American expatriate baseball players in Canada
American sports agents
Baseball players from Oakland, California
Boston Red Sox players
Butte Copper Kings players
Caribes de Oriente players
American expatriate baseball players in Venezuela
Charlotte Rangers players
Colorado Rockies players
Dunedin Blue Jays players
Gastonia Rangers players
Louisville Bats players
Major League Baseball second basemen
New Orleans Zephyrs players
Oklahoma City 89ers players
Pawtucket Red Sox players
Southeastern Oklahoma State Savage Storm baseball players
Texas Rangers players
Toronto Blue Jays players
Tulsa Drillers players